Adamjee Cantonment Public School and College is an intermediate college in Dhaka Cantonment, Dhaka, Bangladesh. The institution was established in 1960 following the ideology of original renowned public schools of England – Eton and Harrow. It is managed by Bangladesh Army and primarily for the children of Army personnel. But students from the civilian section also can study in this college.

History 
On 16 February 1960, Adamjee Cantonment College started its journey as an English medium school that was founded by Gul Muhammad Adamjee (son of Sir Adamjee Haji Dawood, founder of Adamjee Group). The institution was later renamed Adamjee Cantonment College. A public school attached to the college served students in first to tenth grade. The school was separated in 1995 and was made totally an independent institution.

Location and infrastructure 
The college is located in the center of Dhaka Cantonment, Dhaka, capital of Bangladesh.

Spread across nearly 10 acres of land, the college has an administration building, a science building, a library building, a BBA building, a Masters building, a playground, a mosque, a garden, a cafeteria, a Shaheed Minar and a stage (Shaheed Rumi Moncho).

Academics 
Education, Discipline, Morality – these three words are the motto of the college.

Admission 
The college authority publishes an admission circular every year after the publication of the SSC results. New students (both boys and girls) are admitted to the 11th grade via online applications. They are admitted to the college according to the merit list based on their obtained marks in the SSC examinations. The children of Army personnel have a special quota for admission.

Curriculum 
Higher secondary level: HSC – science (Bengali version and English version), humanities (Bengali version), and business studies (Bengali version and English version).

Graduate level: Bachelors of Arts (honours) – English, economics, political science; Bachelor of Commerce (honours) – management, accounting; Bachelor of Business Administration.

Postgraduate level: Master of Arts – English, economics, political science; Master of Commerce – management, accounting.

Its' honours and master's programs are affiliated to the National University of Bangladesh.

Extracurricular activities 
The college is noteworthy for its extracurricular activities which are performed by students that fall outside the realm of the normal curriculum of college education. Examples include hosting science festivals and Model United Nations (MUN) assemblies, participating in debate competitions and sports tournaments, and so on.

The college holds annual sports competitions that help students develop mental and physical toughness.

Photo gallery

Notable alumni 
 Ayman Sadiq, Bangladeshi education entrepreneur and founder of 10 Minute School
 Md. Mofizul Islam, Senior Secretary, Government of Bangladesh and current Chairperson of Bangladesh Competition Commission 
 Chowdhury Abdullah Al-Mamun, Bangladesh Police officer and current Inspector General of  Bangladesh Police
 Mohammad Khaled Hossain, Bangladeshi mountaineer and film director
 Piash Karim, sociologist and political commentator
 Salman Shah, Bangladeshi film actor
 Shafi Imam Rumi, freedom fighter and martyr in the Liberation War of Bangladesh
 Tareque Masud, Bangladeshi film director
 Ferdous Ahmed  Bangladeshi film actor and producer
 Tony Dias, Bangladeshi television actor and director

References

External links
 Official Website

Colleges affiliated to National University, Bangladesh
Educational Institutions affiliated with Bangladesh Army
Colleges in Bangladesh
Universities and colleges in Dhaka
Colleges in Dhaka District